Shekarabad (also Romanized as Shekarābād) is a village in Hakimabad Rural District, in the Central District of Zarandieh County, Markazi Province, Iran. At the 2006 census, its population was 153, in 41 families.

References 

Populated places in Zarandieh County